In Japanese patent law, F-term is a system for classifying Japanese patent documents according to the technical features of the inventions described in them.  It is not a replacement for the International Patent Classification (IPC) or other patent classifications, but complements other systems by providing a means for searching documents from different viewpoints.  A symbol attached to a patent document, indicating that the invention disclosed in the document has a particular technical feature, is also called an F-term.

External links 
  F-term lists and F-term search on the Industrial Property Digital Library (IPDL) by INPIT, a Japanese governmental agency
 Japanese FI classification and F-terms now available in English (March 2001) by the European Patent Office on Japanese patent classifications (version archived by www.archive.org)
 

Japanese patent law
Patent classifications